Anthomyia procellaris is a species of fly in the family Anthomyiidae.

Distribution
This species is present in Europe, the East Palearctic realm (China and Japan), the Near East, and the Nearctic realm (Michigan south to North Carolina).

Description
These small flies show velvety black on greyish markings, with three black spots on the center of the  thorax. The eyes are bare and the proboscis is robust. The abdomen is mainly greyish.

This species is very similar to Anthomyia imbrida and Anthomyia pluvialis and it is a quite difficult species to identify correctly. However in Anthomyia procellaris the black marking just at the base of the wings is not divided into two separate areas and ends in a straight rear boundary. Moreover in males the anterodorsal hairs on the hind tibia are less than 9.

Habitat and biology
These flies prefer wooded habitats and hedge rows. They fly from Spring to autumn and love sun bathing. They feed on nectar, pollen and excrements. Larvae are associated with bird’s nests and feed on bird droppings.

References

External links
 Commanster
 Inaturalist

External links 
 
 

Anthomyiidae
Insects described in 1866
Taxa named by Camillo Rondani